Sasakawa (written: 笹川 lit. "Sasa river") is a Japanese surname. Notable people with the surname include:

, Japanese bacteriologist
Hiroyoshi Sasakawa (born 1966), Japanese politician and businessman
, Japanese businessman and politician
, Japanese activist

Japanese-language surnames